Shirindari was Khatun of Mongols from 1294 to 1305 as  principal consort of Temür Khan.

Biography 
Like Chabi and Nambui, she was from Khongirad clan. Her father was Olochin, who was Kublai khan's sister Yesubuha's son and her mother was Grand Princess Öljei of Lu, daughter of Kublai and Chabi. Her mother Öljei died when she was 5 and her father Olochin died in 1277. She raised to be queen by her grandmother Chabi. According  to History of Yuan, she was married to Temür Khan and bore his only son Prince Dashi (died January 3rd, 1306). However, Japanese researcher Uno Nobuhiro thinks of this information as later falsification by Ayurbawada's mother Dagi, according to him it was Bulugan who bore Temür a son. She died in 1305 and was replaced by Bulugan as principal wife of Temür. She was given a posthumous title Empress Zhēncí Jìngyì by Külüg Khan.

References 

Yuan dynasty empresses
13th-century Mongolian women